The following is a list of characters in the A&E drama series Breakout Kings.

The Team

Charlie Duchamp 
Charlie Duchamp (Laz Alonso), a Deputy U.S. Marshal and head of the task force. He came from the Department of Criminal Program Analysis and was assigned to a desk job for six years because of a congenital heart defect which is revealed in the episode "Paid in Full". He has a wife Marisol, whom he loves but has trouble putting above his work. Against his doctor’s and wife’s advice he agrees to lead the task force. He was under a great deal of pressure to produce results, since any failures in the task force could have led to his being permanently placed on desk work. Despite it, he always stood for his team. In the episode "There Are Rules" when U.S. Marshals Chief Director Richard Wendell wanted Ray off the team claiming he is a dirty cop, Charlie put his own career on the line to retain Ray and keep the team together. Also in the season two premiere episode "An Unjust Death" when Chief Inspector Craig Renner offered him a promotion, he turned it down for the team, but unfortunately Charlie was killed in action by fugitive Damian Fontleroy in the same episode.

Ray Zancanelli 
Ray Zancanelli (Domenick Lombardozzi), a former Deputy U.S. Marshal who lost his job after he was convicted of stealing money from a crime scene to buy his daughter a car. This information was originally kept a secret from the other convicts until Shea overheard Charlie discussing it with Ray. He appears to be able to relate better with the convicts than Charlie because he has been in a position similar to theirs. Ray is on parole throughout season one, living at a halfway house, and has been appointed a Special Deputy U.S. Marshal. He knows the streets well and takes care of business in his own, unorthodox style. Because of his appointed position, he is allowed to carry a weapon, unlike the convicts. Though his obsessive devotion to his job leads to divorce, he still maintains a close relationship with his daughter Teresa who stays with his ex-wife Christina. He cares so much for her that he tries to protect her from a convict in the episode "Like Father, Like Son". Despite her psychological disorders, Ray hired Julianne and trusted her. Julianne admired Ray, even at one point showing romantic interest in Ray and tried to kiss him in the episode "Fun with Chemistry". Prior to his conviction, he came up with the idea for the task force. After Charlie's death in season two, Chief Director Wendell reinstates Ray to his former position, having promised to do so if Charlie accepted a promotion. He routinely calls the convicts on the task force, "animals," though he has warmed up in recent episodes.

Shea Daniels 
Seamus "Shea" Daniels (Malcolm Goodwin), a former gang leader whose criminal enterprises (drug smuggling, weapons trafficking, etc.) covered most of the United States. At 17 years old, Shea started a gang in Washington Heights, New York. At 20 he had set up crews in New Jersey, Pennsylvania, and Connecticut. By 23, his "franchise" was in 40 cities in 32 states. His experience and "street smarts" allow him to provide a working knowledge of how convicts think and move. He originally came up with the name "Breakout Kings" for the task force and designed a graffiti-style logo for it. He has girlfriend Vanessa whom he deeply cares for. In the episode "One for the Money", he told his girlfriend Vanessa that he needs to follow the rules if he ever wants to see her again, before leaving a small diamond from the jewelry store in her hand. In the season one finale episode "Where in the World is Carmen Vega", when Vanessa was kidnapped, he was desperate to put everything in line to save her. In the episode, "Freakshow", it is revealed that he is afraid of clowns.

Fritz Gunderson 

Fritz Gunderson (Brock Johnson) was one of the four initial convicts and former fugitives chosen by Ray Zancanelli to help catch other fugitives, using their expertise as criminals to do so. But when he tried to escape using a knife he swiped while they stopped for lunch at a restaurant he was sent back to the Coxsackie Correctional Facility with his sentence doubled. He returned on the episode Off the Beaten Path to help the team find a deranged and crazy man in the Adirondacks, a place he knew about. However, he only leads them to the trail as Erica states they can continue without his help as she once tracked a man here. Fritz is tied up to the van and at the end of the episode, he is sent back to Coxsackie with a plate of ribs, a case of beer and a Hustler magazine.

Philomena "Philly" Rotchliffer 
Philomena "Philly" Rotchliffer (Nicole Steinwedell), was one of the four initial convicts and former fugitives chosen by Ray Zancanelli to help catch other fugitives, using their expertise as criminals to do so. But she was sent back to the Muncy Correctional Institution with her prison sentence doubled when she accessed her bank accounts in Denmark to fund an escape plan.

Erica Reed 

Erica Reed (Serinda Swan), a bounty hunter and expert tracker. She is Philly's replacement on the team. Unlike the rest of her teammates she was hand-picked by Charlie Duchamp instead of Ray Zancanelli. She was raised by her father, who himself was a bounty hunter. He was tortured and killed in retaliation for the capture of a gang member, and Erica hunted down and killed five of the six people involved in the murder. Barely 20 at the time, she killed her victims and hid their bodies so flawlessly that she was only convicted of weapons charges. She has a daughter who currently resides with the child's father Denny but she has little to no contact with her, despite her desire to be more involved with her. The murder of her father and the loss of her daughter causes her great pain and anger. Beneath her stoic demeanor, Erica has a volatile temper she constantly fights to keep in check, but it can, and sometimes does, violently erupt.

In season two, she shows romantic interest in a neighbor Pete Gillies who works on the second floor of their building. She even slept with him at some occasions without the team knowing about it. But in the episode "SEALd Fate", she realizes he used her to find a person Tommy Fitzgerald and disappeared thereafter. Later, in the episode "Freakshow", he contacts Erica, tells her that he has decided to run away and asks her to come along with him. But she refuses and tells him to disappear. Erica contacts him and he tells her he is going to turn himself in and implicate her as well. However, in the episode "Served Cold", Shea gets to know about Pete's plans. Shea uses Erica's cellphone and messages him posing as her. He then meets him, beats him up and tells him that he is to confess to everything but should never mention anything about Erica.

Dr. Lloyd Lowery 
Dr. Lloyd Lowery (Jimmi Simpson), a former child prodigy and a behaviorist with a bachelor's degree (1993) and M.D. (1997) from Harvard. He is a genius with a 210 IQ. He provides in-depth psychological evaluations of escaped convicts, which allow him to predict the movements and actions that an escaped convict may undertake before they get away. Lloyd also provides psychological help to Julianne and Erica on their various mental problems whenever possible. Ironically, Lloyd suffers from an addiction to gambling. For selling illegal prescriptions to college students to cover his gambling debts, he lost his medical license and was sentenced to 25 years in prison. He deeply regrets the fact that an 18-year-old girl in a deep depression committed suicide with an overdose of pills he prescribed. In the episode, "SEALd Fate", he got frustrated by the fact that he was kidnapped and made audience to a brutal killing of an innocent girl by Damien Fontleroy. By which he decides to quit the team. However, in the episode "Freakshow", he is convinced by Ray to rejoin the team.

Julianne "Jules" Simms 

Julianne "Jules" Simms (Brooke Nevin), a former student at the Federal Law Enforcement Training Center. She acts as an analyst, researching and determining the various resources at the disposal of the convicts; such as family, money, and property they may use to aid their escape. She was first in her class until she was expelled for her various psychological disorders which include social anxiety, panic disorder, and depression which derailed her career. She retreated to the basement apartment of her mother's home where she worked as a telemarketer, never truly having to interact with others. Despite her psychological disorders, Ray hired Julianne and trusted her. By which Julianne admired Ray, even at one point showing romantic interest in Ray and tried to kiss him in the episode "Fun with Chemistry".

Relationship with Lloyd
Julianne and Lloyd share a very friendly relationship since Lloyd willfully attempts to help her overcome her disorders. In turn Julianne cares for Lloyd and considers him a very important friend. In the episode "SEALd Fate", she rejected Lloyd's proposal and told she has only feelings of friendship towards him. She was very shaken when Lloyd was kidnapped by Damien Fontelroy. She was almost in tears before she gets to see that Lloyd is safe.

Recurring

Marisol Duchamp

Marisol (Yara Martinez) is the wife of Charlie Duchamp. In the episode, "Like Father, Like Son", she was almost killed by a package bomb sent by Christian Beaumont to Duchamp's residence.

Vanessa 

Vanessa (Tattiawna Jones) is the girlfriend of Shea Daniels. In the episode "Where in the World is Carmen Vega", she was kidnapped and held hostage by Carmen Vega's men but was later rescued.

Teresa 

Teresa (Zoë Belkin) is the daughter of Ray Zancanelli. In the episode "Served Cold", she was kidnapped by Damien Fontleroy but was later rescued.

Richard Wendell 

Richard Wendell (Gregg Henry) is the Chief Director for the U.S. Marshals.

Pete Gillies 

Pete Gillies (Ian Bohen) is a man who works on the second floor of the Breakout Kings' building. Erica had a romantic interest in him. She even slept with him at some occasions without the team knowing about it. But in the episode "SEALd Fate", she realizes he used her to find a person named Tommy Fitzgerald, and he disappears thereafter. Later, in the episode "Freakshow", he contacts Erica, tells her that he has decided to run away and asks her to come along with him. But she refuses and tells him to disappear. Erica contacts him and he tells her he is going to turn himself in and implicate her as well. However, in the episode "Served Cold", Shea gets to know about Pete's plans. Shea uses Erica's cellphone and messages him posing as her. He then meets him, beats him up and tells him that he is to confess to everything but should never mention anything about Erica.

The Fugitives
The following are the list of escaped fugitives which the team has caught so far.

Season 1 
The fugitives of the season one episodes are as follows,

Season 2 
The fugitives of the season two episodes are as follows,

References

Breakout Kings
Characters